Great Heck is a small village in Heck parish, about  south of Selby, North Yorkshire, England. The population of the parish was 201 at the 2011 census. It is part of the district of Selby, having been part of the West Riding of Yorkshire until 1974. The village was the site of the Great Heck rail crash in 2001.

Village

The village of Great Heck is a rural community. It consists of mainly detached residential housing and small companies such as Great Heck Brewery. There are a number of farms and a nursery.

Demographics

Population
The first recorded census occurred in 1881 with the population being 226. A census was carried out every ten years up until 1961. Information and statistics were available on total population, population change, gender and area throughout the time the census were being carried out. There are no census records for 1941 due to the Second World War. There is no great change in population from 1881 to 1961, although in 1931 the census data showed a population of 192 and in 1951 it had decreased to 165. This may have been the result of the Second World War. From 1961 the census data began gathering information from some places by wards and no longer by parishes.

The 2011 census showed a population of 201, with the male:female ratio as even as possible with 101 females and 100 males living in 80 households. The census shows that Great Heck consists of mainly families, with 43 people aged 5–19 and 93 aged 30–59. Out of 201 people, 193 were born in England.

Occupational structure
The 1881 census provides information on the occupational category the population fall into. The data shows that 36 of the 116 males worked in agriculture while the other male workers were spread out in categories including transport, food and lodging and textile fabrics. Contrastingly, the female data shows that 39 of 110 had unknown occupations. Other women worked in occupational categories such as agriculture and domestic services.

According to the 2011 census there were 111 people employed out of 201. Out of the 111, 57 were male and 54 female. The most popular categories of employment were wholesale and retail trade, construction and manufacturing.

Transport

Great Heck is accessible through a number of lanes such as Heck and Pollington Lane, Heck Lane and Long Lane. Following Heck Lane and then taking a right turning into Balne Moor Road, you will eventually meet the A19 Road or Selby Road. This road joins up with the M62 motorway. There are 3 bus routes serving the parish Great Heck. The 486 bus travels from Selby to Hut green, stopping at five other locations in between including Great Heck. The 488 travels from Hut Green to Goole before stopping at seven other destinations including Great Heck. The 019s bus is a school service bus taking pupils to and from Holy Family RC School and The Snaith School. The nearest coach stop is Goole: Airmyn Road.

Whitley Bridge and Snaith stations are also nearby.

Incidents

Great Heck rail crash

The Great Heck rail crash, also known as the Selby rail crash, was a high speed train accident that occurred on the morning of 28 February 2001. Ten people were killed, including the drivers of both trains, while a further 82 suffered serious injuries. The crash occurred when a Land Rover towing a loaded trailer swerved off the M62 motorway just before a bridge over the East Coast Main Line. The vehicle then ran down an embankment and onto the southbound track. The driver of the Land Rover tried to reverse the car off the track but could not. After he exited the vehicle and called the emergency services, his Land Rover was hit by a southbound GNER InterCity 225 en route from Newcastle to London King's Cross. The train was travelling at over 120 miles per hour (190 km per hour).

The InterCity 225 was propelled by a Class 91 locomotive (No.91023) and led by a Driving Van Trailer (DVT). After striking the Land Rover, the leading bogie of the DVT derailed but the train stayed upright. Points to nearby sidings then deflected it into the path of an oncoming Freightliner freight train carrying coal from Immingham to Ferrybridge. The freight train hit the wreckage, resulting in severe to moderate damage to all nine of the InterCity 225's coaches.

The closing speed was said to be  making it the highest speed railway incident in the UK.

2015 refuse fire  
Great Heck was affected for several months by a massive refuse fire in a privately owned waste tip that resisted attempts to extinguish it. The tip first combusted in May 2015 and continued to catch fire up until December 2015, by which time firefighters from North Yorkshire, South Yorkshire and Humberside had responded 385 times to the smouldering tip. In November 2015, local authorities, including Selby District Council, aided by North Yorkshire Fire and Rescue Service and the Environment Agency, started a clean-up effort intended to extinguish the fire. By January 2016, the contents were cleared and taken to a landfill site at Welbeck in West Yorkshire.

References

External links 

Villages in North Yorkshire